Lucia & The Best Boys are a Scottish indie rock band.

History 
The band members met in Glasgow while performing in other bands. They were formerly known as LUCIA.

Discography

Extended Plays 

 Best Boy (2017)
 Cheap Talk (2 November 2018)
 Eternity (31 January 2020)
 The State of Things (9 October 2020)

Singles 

 Melted Ice Cream (2017)
 Good Girls Do Bad Things (October 2019)
 City Of Angels (31 January 2020)
 Let Go (22 May 2020)
 Perfectly Untrue (September 2020)
 Forever Forget (January 2021)
 When You Dress Up (February 2023)

References

External links 
 Official website

Musical groups from Glasgow
Musical quartets
Scottish indie rock groups